Sija Rose is an Indian actress, who predominantly works in Malayalam and Tamil Cinema. She hosted the television reality show Lets Dance on Amrita TV in the year 2014. Sija participates in the reality show Star Challenge on Flowers TV. Sija played a small role as Dulquar Salman's sister in her first Malayalam film Ustad Hotel. She made her debut in Tamil with the movie Kozhi Koovuthu playing a role of a village girl named Thulasi in the year 2012.

Early life

Sija completed her schooling from Indian school al wadi al kabir in Muscat, Oman. Sija Rose wanted to follow her father's footsteps and pursue journalism. She completed her graduation from Mumbai.

Career

After completing her graduation, she was in Kerala for holiday. During that period, she got the opportunity to do modelling and appeared in a few TV commercials which led to her getting a film offer. Her debut venture was the Kannada film Magadi in 2012. In her first Malayalam film Ustad Hotel, she played a small role as Dulquar Salman's sister. Also in 2012, she made her Tamil debut in Kozhi Koovuthu, playing a village belle called Thulasi.

In 2013, she had three releases on the same day: debut director N. K. Gireesh's Nee Ko Njaa Cha, Annayum Rasoolum and Rajesh Amanakara's Entry. While she was the female lead in Nee Ko Njaa Cha, in which she did the role of a hotel receptionist, she was seen in supporting roles in Annayum Rasoolum and Entry. "It's about a simple girl who values Indian culture and traditions," said the actress. Her next two releases were the Tamil films Masani and Madhavanum Malarvizhiyum in which she was seen as a Bharatanatyam dancer. Thereafter she worked as an assistant director with Rajesh Pillai for the Hindi film Traffic and did not accept any acting offers in the meantime. After the completion of Traffic she signed her next film, Bijith Bala's debut venture Nellikka in which she plays Priya, the love interest of lead actor Deepak. She has also signed up the period-drama Ennu Ninte Moideen based on the real life love story of Moideen and Kanchanamala.

In 2014, she hosted the reality television show Let's Dance on Amrita TV.

Filmography

Films

Television

References

External links
 
 

Year of birth missing (living people)
Indian film actresses
Actresses in Tamil cinema
Actresses from Kozhikode
Actresses in Malayalam cinema
Living people
21st-century Indian actresses
Actresses in Hindi cinema
Actresses in Kannada cinema